The 1st constituency of Marne (French: Première circonscription de la Marne) is one of five electoral districts in the department of the same name, each of which returns one deputy to the French National Assembly in elections using the two-round system, with a run-off if no candidate receives more than 50% of the vote in the first round.

Description
The constituency is made up of five (pre-2015) cantons: those of Bourgogne, Reims II, Reims IV, Reims VI, and Reims X.

It includes the northern part of Reims, the department's largest city, as well as some rural territory between it and the border with Ardennes.

At the time of the 1999 census (which was the basis for the most recent redrawing of constituency boundaries, carried out in 2010) the 1st constituency had a total population of 100,826.

The seat has been a conservative stronghold for many years and was held by Jean Falala, the long-serving mayor of Reims, until 2002 when he passed the seat on to his son Francis Falala. Francis, however, failed to match his father's longevity and lost the UMP nomination to Renaud Dutreil prior to the 2007 election, before standing as an independent and coming third in the first round of voting.

Historic representation

Election results

2022 

 
 
|-
| colspan="8" bgcolor="#E9E9E9"|
|-

2017

2012

 
 
 
 
 
|-
| colspan="8" bgcolor="#E9E9E9"|
|-

Sources
Official results of French elections from 2002: "Résultats électoraux officiels en France" (in French).

Official results of French elections, Marne 1st, from 2017: "" (in French)

1